Lung Ping & Sheung Pak Tin, formerly called Chak On and Lung Ping, is one of the 25 constituencies in the Sham Shui Po District of Hong Kong which was created in 2007.

The constituency loosely covers Tai Wo Ping in Shek Kip Mei with the estimated population of 15,802.

Councillors represented

Chak On (1994–2003)

Lung Ping (2003–2007)

Lung Ping & Sheung Pak Tin (2007–present)

Election results

2010s

2000s

1990s

References

Constituencies of Hong Kong
Constituencies of Sham Shui Po District Council
2007 establishments in Hong Kong
Constituencies established in 2007
Shek Kip Mei